Harding Lemay (March 16, 1922 – May 26, 2018), also known as Pete Lemay, was an American screenwriter and playwright. He was best known for his stint as head writer of the soap opera Another World.

Career
Lemay was head writer of the soap opera Another World, from 1971 to 1979. The series earned a Daytime Emmy Award for Outstanding Drama Series in 1976. By 1979, Lemay decided not to continue writing the series for a ninth straight calendar year, and first handed over the reins to a new writer before exiting for good later that year. He also wrote out three of the show's most popular actors George Reinholt (Steve Frame), Jacqueline Courtney (Alice Matthews Frame), and Virginia Dwyer (Mary Matthews), in 1975.

Lemay co-created Lovers and Friends with Paul Rauch, later retooled and referred to as For Richer, For Poorer. Lemay was also a playwright, whose works have been produced both off-Broadway and on Broadway. He was also a friend and mentor to Douglas Marland, who served as his subwriter on Another World and later became one of daytime's most prolific writers, serving as head writer for Guiding Light, General Hospital and As the World Turns.

Personal life
Lemay was born on March 16, 1922, near the Mohawk Indian reservation in North Bangor, New York, where his mother grew up; he ran away to New York City at age 17. There, he attended the Neighborhood Playhouse School of the Theatre. From September 1947 to 1953, he was married to Priscilla Amidon. He married his second wife, Dorothy Shaw on September 19, 1953; she died in 1994. His third wife was Gloria Gardner. Lemay died on May 26, 2018, at the age of 96.

Positions held
Another World
Story Consultant (1995–1997)
Head writer (1971–1979; 1988)

As the World Turns
Story Consultant

The Doctors
Head writer (1981–1982)

Guiding Light
Consultant (1995)
Writer (1980-1981)

Lovers and Friends/For Richer, For Poorer
Co-Creator
Head writer (1977)

One Life to Live
Story Consultant (1998–1999)

Awards and nominations
Daytime Emmy Awards

WINS 
(1975; Best Writing; Another World)
(1981; Best Writing; Guiding Light)

NOMINATIONS 
(1977 & 1996; Best Writing; Another World)

HW Tenure

Works

References

External links
1997 Interview with Soap Opera Digest

1922 births
2018 deaths
American soap opera writers
Place of death missing
Daytime Emmy Award winners
People from Bangor, New York
People from Fire Island, New York
Screenwriters from New York (state)